Masnan may refer to:
 Masnàn, a mountain in Switzerland
 Mahsnan, a village in Iran